"Feel Like Makin' Love" is a song by English supergroup Bad Company. The power ballad originally appeared on the LP Straight Shooter in April 1975 and was released as a single in August of the same year. It was named the 78th best hard rock song of all time by VH1.

The song, along with other Bad Company music, was featured in the 2001 film Scotland, PA.

Origin
Paul Rodgers started to come up with the lyrics at a camp in California while touring the US with Free. He was 19 years old. After several years, Rodgers played it to Bad Company guitarist Mick Ralphs who threw in that big chord in the chorus - the muted 'duh-duh' that marks the shift from country ballad to chest-beating rocker.

Reception
Cash Box said that the "strong two-pronged attack from Ralphs' guitar and Rodgers' vocals make the track an excellent choice to follow 'Good Lovin'.'" Record World said that the song was "a Pentangle-influenced British folk-rock original" in which "guitars alternate between acoustical peace and electronic pow for a most unique effect."

Ultimate Classic Rock critic Matt Wardlaw rated it as Bad Company's 2nd best song, saying that "a muscular guitar riff from Mick Ralphs then adds extra emphasis to the bluesy passion of Rodgers' vocals."  Classic Rock History critic Janey Roberts also rated it as Bad Company's 2nd best song.  Classic Rock critic Malcolm Dome rated it as Bad Company's 3rd best song, praising the "unmistakable guitar opening", "the strolling introduction, opening out into a more strident chorus" and "Ralphs’ stunning guitar pattern."

Charts

Personnel
Paul Rodgers – lead and backing vocals, rhythm guitar
Mick Ralphs – lead guitar
Boz Burrell – bass guitar
Simon Kirke – drums

Pauline Henry version

In 1993, the song was covered by British-Jamaican former the Chimes singer Pauline Henry, titled "Feel Like Making Love". The single reached No. 12 in the United Kingdom, No. 13 in Australia and Denmark, and No. 17 in New Zealand. On the Eurochart Hot 100, it peaked at No. 26.

Critical reception
Larry Flick from Billboard wrote, "On this smashing solo debut, she wraps her well-honed chords around a shiny Bad Company classic rock gem. The result is a guitar-driven pop/hip hop shuffler drenched in the kind of sweet diva drama that top 40 and R&B radio love to actively pump." In his weekly UK chart commentary, James Masterton said, "A much better showing from the former Chimes vocalist after her debut single "Too Many People" disappointed many by only peaking at No.38." Pan-European magazine Music & Media commented, "Attention to all retro maniacs out there. On the borders between rock and dance Henry covers this '70s rocker by Bad Company." Alan Jones from Music Week gave it four out of five, calling it "a surprisingly faithful rock arrangement on the regular mix, [with] Ms Henry's tones making an ideal substitute for those of the equally soulful Paul Rodgers. A plethora of additional mixes take the track to the dancefloor, guaranteeing a hit." Wendi Cermak from The Network Forty declared it as a "soulful rendition", adding that "just as crunchy as the original, this funky diva adds a '90s attitudinal delivery." Adam Higginbotham from Select felt the singer "do[es] some Jennifer Rush-style rockin'" on the song. Mark Sutherland from Smash Hits complimented it as "quite good".

Track listing

Charts

Weekly charts

Year-end charts

Certifications

Philip Claypool version
A cover was released by country music artist Philip Claypool in 1995 on his debut album A Circus Leaving Town. It was the highest-charting of that album's four singles, peaking at No. 60 on the Hot Country Songs chart.

Kid Rock version
The song was covered by Kid Rock on his self-titled 2003 release. His version peaked at No. 33 on the Mainstream Rock Tracks chart.

Other versions
Millie Jackson recorded "Feel Like Making Love" in 1976, reaching No. 71 on the R&B chart.
 The song was covered by Trey Parker in character as Ned Gerblansky for Chef Aid: The South Park Album.

References

1974 songs
1975 singles
1993 singles
1995 singles
2003 singles
Bad Company songs
Hard rock ballads
Country rock songs
Pauline Henry songs
Philip Claypool songs
Kid Rock songs
Songs written by Paul Rodgers
Songs written by Mick Ralphs
Swan Song Records singles
S2 Records singles
1970s ballads